Earl Strickland (born June 8, 1961) is an American professional pool player who is considered one of the best nine-ball players of all time. He has won over 100 championship titles and three world titles. In 2006 he was inducted into the Billiard Congress of America's Hall of Fame. In 1996, Strickland won the largest cash prize to date winning the PCA $1,000,000 Challenge by being the first player to run 10 consecutive racks in a tournament. He is also known as one of the sport's most controversial players for his outspoken views and his sometimes volatile behavior at tournaments.

Career
Strickland started playing pool at the age of 8. After intensive practice, he entered his first professional tournament aged 16. Strickland rose to national prominence in 1983 with a victory in Caesars Tahoe Billiard Classic defeating Steve Mizerak in the finals and winning $35,000. This was followed in 1984 by winning the McDermott Masters 9-Ball Championship.

According to sources, Strickland played "like a polished gem." He was beginning to be a dominant force on the tournament trail and recognized as a future world champion. He had the "skill, endurance, patience, temperament, and tenacity of which champions are made." Because of his dominance, Strickland was named The National Billiard News Player of the Year in 1984. He won the 1988 PBA World 9-Ball Championship, after a momentous final confrontation between himself and Mike Sigel.

A 45-second shot clock was used to monitor each shot because the tournament was being recorded for broadcast for a seven-week series. At the conclusion, Sigel commented he could feel the pressure of being clocked. Strickland, on the other hand, said they "could have made it only 30 seconds between shots, and it wouldn't have mattered."

At the 2004 Derby City Classic, a week-long multiple tournament event held every January in Louisville, Kentucky, Strickland was one of six competitors in a nine-ball ring game. Veteran Grady Mathews, when introducing Strickland, says that when Strickland is in the house, "A hush ensues, and there is an expectation" due to his brilliant shot-making capabilities and unpredictable behaviour.

Awards and accolades
Strickland is a multiple winner of the prestigious Billiards Digest Player of the Year in 1984, 1985, 1987, 1988 and 2000 including Billiards Digest Player of the Decade in the 1980s.

His career highlights of a record three WPA World Nine-ball Championships & a record five U.S. Open Nine-ball Championships along with Shane Van Boening & a record three McDermott Masters 9-Ball Championships. Strickland is the only WPA World Nine-ball Champion ever to win the event in consecutive years. At Mosconi Cup, from 1996 until 2005, Strickland holds the record for winning nine times along with Johnny Archer.

Strickland once ran 11 consecutive racks against Nick Mannino during the first PCA tournament in 1996 where there was a stipulation that anyone who could  10 racks would win US$1,000,000. Jimmy Mataya, who was present at the event, witnessed Strickland's last shot, a tough nine-ball  in which Earl showed no fear and "fired it in with authority" to win the prize.  Up to that time, no one had ever run 10 racks of 9-ball in a row during a professionally sanctioned event.  The feat has never been duplicated in a tournament since. This Million dollar Challenge event was a kickoff for the new tour, which Earl Strickland, C.J. Wiley, and others helped to build. He won it on the first day of the event and the very start of the brand new tour association (PCA). The insurance company backing the event refused to pay and lawsuits were filed.  Two and one half years later, the insurers were forced to pay up.  Unfortunately, due to expenses of the legal battle, Earl received less than a $1,000,000 and this resulted in negative publicity around it and led to a very premature demise of the new PCA tour. Earl was very gracious about the money, but sorely disappointed that the new tour got off to a bad start. The scandal and a feud with the already existing feud with the Professional Billiards Tour fearing lost revenues and television contracts spelled doom and led to a quick demise of the new tour.

For 2007, he was ranked #6 in Pool & Billiard Magazine's "Fans' Top 20 Favorite Players" poll.

Controversy

World Nine-ball Championship
Strickland has engaged in exchanges with fans, players, referees, and tournament officials. His 2003 WPA World Nine-ball Championship match with snooker star Steve Davis was particularly notorious. Before the match, Strickland had given a particularly charged interview with a Sky Sports reporter, in which he complained that fans had been disrespectful to him (booing when his name had been broadcast over the PA), and that the event "revolves around Davis" (the event was organized by Matchroom Sport, which was headed by Davis' manager Barry Hearn, while Sky's coverage had featured Davis heavily to win an audience in the UK). He also appeared upset that Sky Sports had shown numerous replays during the buildup to the match of Davis beating him in the previous year's Mosconi Cup, the match which settled the event in favour of Team Europe.

During the match, Strickland entered the arena visibly downbeat, and after beginning the match in a quiet mood, Strickland soon began to engage in heated verbal arguments with fans and then referee Michaela Tabb. TV microphones caught him using foul language to one member of the crowd, then telling Tabb to "shut up" when she reprimanded him. In response, Davis made use of his entitlement to take a break in the match. (Davis admitted later that the timing of this was intentional, leaving Strickland to the mercy of the crowd.) During the gap, Strickland put his fingers in his ears to block out the crowd's support for Davis, to the derision of the crowd, who mocked the gesture, and cheered loudly for Davis whenever Strickland took his fingers out. Late in the match, he responded to Davis' missing of an easy shot by sharply leaping out of his chair, fists aloft, shouting to the crowd "Yeah! He dogged it!" When Davis took a second break, Strickland loudly complained that players were only entitled to a single break, telling the crowd "He's Steve Davis, he can do what he likes," another reference to his belief that Davis's status at Matchroom Sport afforded him special treatment.

Strickland's tirade against Davis, the crowd, and the rules of the event, continued through the main part of a post-match interview, before visibly calming and apologizing for his behaviour. After admitting regret over his reactions during the encounter with Davis, Strickland entered the arena for his next match carrying a bunch of flowers which he gave to Tabb by way of an apology, and proceeded to play in a much calmer manner for the remainder of the event. Davis would go on to liken his match with Strickland to his 1980s snooker matches against Alex Higgins, another player noted for his combination of impressive play and enigmatic behaviour.

Mosconi Cup
At the 2006 Mosconi Cup, which took place at Rotterdam, Netherlands between December 7 and 10, the audience was loud, cheering and blowing horns when rooting for Team Europe. During a match with Nick van den Berg, someone shouted from the audience for Strickland to "shut up" since he had continued talking while opponents were taking their shots. The noise was so intense that referee Michaela Tabb warned spectators they could be thrown out of the arena if they persisted. Strickland broke his cue out of frustration during his match against Thomas Engert, smashing it against the floor after a failed attempt at a shot. He replaced the broken shaft and went on to win the match 7–4.

One year later, the 2007 Mosconi Cup in Las Vegas saw Strickland complain strongly about the "misbehavior" of European players and fans, reaching its peak in a particularly bad-tempered clash between himself and reigning world champion Daryl Peach where the referee (again Tabb) had to separate the two amid fears their animosity might turn violent. Whereas most matches in the event were followed by live TV interviews with both players, Strickland refused to participate, while the normally mild-mannered Peach stated "Strickland is the scum of the Earth, everyone knows that." Given the opportunity to retract the statement moments later by the interviewer, he declined.

The next year, 2008, saw the event played in Portomaso, Malta. Strickland's opening night match again saw him repeatedly argue with European fans in the crowd, and also repeatedly comment aloud that the table was playing too easily. In a post-match interview, he stated that it was bad for the sport if the public sees top players in a high-profile event using a table that was clearly playing more easily than a standard club table. When the crowd gave a mixed reaction to his comments, he turned to the spectators and attempted to rally them by calling "Do you want to see us have an easy time out here? Or do you want to see these guys shit on themselves?" Presenter Andy Goldstein immediately apologised to viewers, an action that prompted Strickland to further argue that such language is acceptable, citing Tiger Woods as a fellow sportsman who has used such language on TV without being challenged.

Asked about the possibility of banning Strickland from future events for his behaviour, Matchroom Sports founder Barry Hearn stated he would always want Strickland to participate in the firm's events, since his presence "guarantees drama and unpredictability." Strickland, though, would be dropped by the United States team for the 2009 Mosconi Cup and was not selected again for the next three years before returning to the team in 2013.

At the 2022 Mosconi Cup Strickland became the oldest player to be selected at the age of 61, although only securing a single point for his team in a doubles match.

Career titles and achievements

See also

References

External links
 
 "Earl Strickland, Player Profile", InternationalPoolTour.com

1961 births
Living people
American pool players
Sportspeople from North Carolina
People from Roseboro, North Carolina
WPA World Nine-ball Champions